1964 in sports describes the year's events in world sport.

Alpine skiing
 Men's Olympic gold medal:
 Downhill: Egon Zimmermann, Austria
 Slalom: Josef Stiegler, Austria
 Giant Slalom: François Bonlieu, France
 Women's Olympic gold medal:
 Downhill: Christl Haas, Austria
 Slalom: Christine Goitschel, France
 Giant Slalom: Marielle Goitschel, France
 FIS Alpine World Ski Championships –
 Men's combined champion: Ludwig Leitner, Germany
 Women's combined champion: Marielle Goitschel, France

American football
 NFL Championship: the Cleveland Browns won 27–0 over the Baltimore Colts at Cleveland Stadium
 Cotton Bowl (1963 season):
 The Texas Longhorns won 28–6 over the Navy Midshipmen to win the college football national championship
 Heisman Trophy – John Huarte QB, Notre Dame
 AFL Championship – Buffalo Bills win 20–7 over the San Diego Chargers

Association football

England
 FA Cup final – West Ham United won 3–2 over Preston North End

International
 Spain beat the Soviet Union 2–1 to win the European Championship.
 In October during the celebration of the 1964 Summer Olympics FIFA gives the right to host the Football World Cup in 1970 to Mexico.
 The 1964 Jutland Series runs from 30 March to 15 November in Denmark

Athletics
 March 6 – Tom O'Hara sets a new world record for the indoor mile run by completing it in 3 minutes and 56.4 seconds

Australian rules football
 Victorian Football League
 Melbourne wins the 68th VFL Premiership (Melbourne 8.16 (64) d Collingwood 8.12 (60))
 Brownlow Medal awarded to Gordon Collis (Carlton)

Baseball
 February 15 – death of Ken Hubbs (22), Chicago Cubs player, in an air crash just before the season began
April 17 – The New York Mets play their first game at brand-new Shea Stadium and lose 4–3 to the Pittsburgh Pirates. Willie Stargell hits the first home run in the stadium's history, a second-inning solo shot off the Mets' Jack Fisher.
 June 21 – Jim Bunning of the Philadelphia Phillies pitched a perfect game in a 6–0 victory over the New York Mets.
 World Series – St. Louis Cardinals win 4 games to 3 over the New York Yankees. The Series MVP is pitcher, Bob Gibson of St. Louis.
 AL MVP – Brooks Robinson 3B, Baltimore Orioles
 NL MVP – Ken Boyer 3B, St. Louis Cardinals
 AL Rookie of the Year – Tony Oliva OF, Minnesota Twins
 NL Rookie of the Year – Dick Allen 3B, Philadelphia Phillies
 Cy Young Award – Dean Chance, Los Angeles Angels

Basketball
 NCAA Men's Basketball Championship –
 UCLA wins 97–83 over Duke
Associated Press College Basketball Player of the Year – Gary Bradds F, Ohio State
 NBA Finals – Boston Celtics won 4 games to 1 over the San Francisco Warriors
 NBA MVP – Oscar Robertson G, Cincinnati Royals
 NBA Rookie of the Year – Jerry Lucas F, Cincinnati Royals

Boxing
 February 25 in Miami Beach, Florida – Cassius Clay defeated Sonny Liston by TKO in the 7th round to win the World Heavyweight Championship.
 December 14 in Philadelphia, Joey Giardello won a 15-round decision over Rubin "Hurricane" Carter to win the World Middleweight title.

Canadian football
 Grey Cup – B.C. Lions win 34–24 over the Hamilton Tiger-Cats

Cycling
 Giro d'Italia won by Jacques Anquetil of France
 Tour de France – Jacques Anquetil of France
 UCI Road World Championships – Men's road race – Jan Janssen of Netherlands

Field hockey
 Olympic Games (Men's Competition) in Tokyo, Japan
 Gold Medal: India
 Silver Medal: Pakistan
 Bronze Medal: Australia

Figure skating
 World Figure Skating Championships
 Men's champion: Manfred Schnelldorfer, Germany
 Ladies' champion: Sjoukje Dijkstra, Netherlands
 Pair skating champions: Marika Kilius & Hans-Jürgen Bäumler, Germany
 Ice dancing champions: Eva Romanová & Pavel Roman, Czechoslovakia

Golf
Men's professional
 Masters Tournament – Arnold Palmer
 U.S. Open – Ken Venturi
 British Open – Tony Lema
 PGA Championship – Bobby Nichols
 PGA Tour money leader – Jack Nicklaus – $113,285
Men's amateur
 British Amateur – Gordon Clark
 U.S. Amateur – William C. Campbell
Women's professional
 Women's Western Open – Carol Mann
 LPGA Championship – Mary Mills
 U.S. Women's Open – Mickey Wright
 Titleholders Championship – Marilynn Smith
 LPGA Tour money leader – Mickey Wright – $29,800

Harness racing
 United States Pacing Triple Crown races –
 Cane Pace – Race Time
 Little Brown Jug – Vicar Hanover
 Messenger Stakes – Race Time
 Ayres won the United States Trotting Triple Crown races –
 Hambletonian – Ayres
 Yonkers Trot – Ayres
 Kentucky Futurity – Ayres
 Australian Inter Dominion Harness Racing Championship –
 Pacers: Minuteman

Horse racing
 Northern Dancer becomes the first Canadian–bred horse to win the Kentucky Derby
Steeplechases
 Cheltenham Gold Cup – Arkle
 Grand National – Team Spirit
Flat races
 Australia – Melbourne Cup won by Polo Prince
 Canada – Queen's Plate won by Northern Dancer
 France – Prix de l'Arc de Triomphe won by Prince Royal
 Ireland – Irish Derby Stakes won by Santa Claus
 English Triple Crown Races:
 2,000 Guineas Stakes – Baldric
 The Derby – Santa Claus
 St. Leger Stakes – Indiana
 United States Triple Crown Races:
 Kentucky Derby – Northern Dancer
 Preakness Stakes – Northern Dancer
 Belmont Stakes – Quadrangle

Ice hockey
 Art Ross Trophy as the NHL's leading scorer during the regular season: Stan Mikita, Chicago Black Hawks
 Hart Memorial Trophy for the NHL's Most Valuable Player: Jean Beliveau, Montreal Canadiens
 Stanley Cup – Toronto Maple Leafs won 4–3 over the Detroit Red Wings
 World Hockey Championship –
 Men's champion: Soviet Union defeated Sweden
 NCAA Men's Ice Hockey Championship – University of Michigan Wolverines defeat University of Denver Pioneers 6–3 in Denver, Colorado

Lacrosse
 Guelph Mohawks win the first Castrol Cup.
 Vancouver Carlings win the Mann Cup.
 Oshawa Green Gaels win the Minto Cup.

Motorsport

Rugby league
1964 New Zealand rugby league season
1964 NSWRFL season
1963–64 Northern Rugby Football League season / 1964–65 Northern Rugby Football League season

Rugby union
 70th Five Nations Championship series is shared by Scotland and Wales

Snooker
 The World Snooker Championship is revived in a challenge format:
 John Pulman beats Fred Davis 19-16
 John Pulman beats Rex Williams 40-33

Swimming
 February 29 – in Sydney, Australian swimmer Dawn Fraser sets a new world record in the women's 100m freestyle (long course) competition: 58.9 seconds.
 March 29 – Australia's Kevin Berry sets a new world record in the men's 200m butterfly (long course) at a meet in Sydney, clocking 2:06.9.
 July 12 – US swimmer Sharon Stouder breaks the world record in the women's 200m butterfly (long course) with one second, during a meet in Philadelphia, Pennsylvania, clocking 2:28.1.
 August 2 – Sharon Stouder once again breaks the world record in the women's 200m butterfly (long course), this time in Los Altos, California, clocking 2:26.4.
 October 18 – Kevin Berry breaks his own world record in the men's 200m butterfly (long course) on the last day of the swimming competition at the Summer Olympics in Tokyo, Japan, with a time of 2:06.6.

Tennis
Australia
 Australian Men's Singles Championship – Roy Emerson (Australia) defeats Fred Stolle (Australia) 6–3, 6–4, 6–2
 Australian Women's Singles Championship – Margaret Smith Court (Australia) defeats Lesley Turner Bowrey (Australia) 6–3, 6–2
France
 French Men's Singles Championship – Manuel Santana (Spain) defeats Nicola Pietrangeli (Italy) 6–3, 6–1, 4–6, 7–5
 French Women's Singles Championship – Margaret Court (Australia) defeats Maria Bueno (Brazil) 5–7, 6–1, 6–2
UK
 Wimbledon Men's Singles Championship – Roy Emerson (Australia) defeats Fred Stolle (Australia) 6–4, 12–10, 4–6, 6–3
 Wimbledon Women's Singles Championship – Maria Bueno (Brazil) defeats Margaret Smith Court (Australia) 6–4, 7–9, 6–3
USA
 American Men's Singles Championship – Roy Emerson (Australia) defeats Fred Stolle (Australia) in straight sets 6–4, 6–2, 6–4
 American Women's Singles Championship – Maria Bueno (Brazil) defeats Carole Caldwell Graebner (USA) in straight sets 6–1, 6–0
Davis Cup
 1964 Davis Cup –  3–2  at Harold Clark Courts (clay) Cleveland, United States

Volleyball
 Volleyball at the 1964 Summer Olympics won by USSR (men) and Japan (women)

Yacht racing
 The New York Yacht Club retains the America's Cup as Constellation defeats British challenger Sovereign, of the Royal Thames Yacht Club, 4 races to 0

Multi-sport events
 1964 Summer Olympics held in Tokyo, Japan
 United States wins the most gold medals (36) but the Soviet Union wins the most overall medals (96).
 This Olympic opening ceremony is first time of live Olympic telecast program by geostationary communication satellite.
 1964 Winter Olympics held in Innsbruck, Austria
 USSR wins the most medals (25), and the most gold medals (11).
 Third Winter Universiade held in Špindleruv Mlýn, Czechoslovakia

Awards
 Associated Press Male Athlete of the Year – Don Schollander, Swimming
 Associated Press Female Athlete of the Year – Mickey Wright, LPGA golf
 ABC's Wide World of Sports Athlete of the Year: Don Schollander, Swimming
Sports Illustrated Sportsman of the Year – Ken Venturi – Golf

References

 
Sports by year